Scott Conrad Bedke (born April 27, 1958) is an American politician serving as the 44th lieutenant governor of Idaho since 2023. He served as a member of the Idaho House of Representatives for the 27A district. In December 2012, Bedke defeated fellow Republican Lawerence Denney to become speaker of the Idaho House of Representatives.

Early life and education
Bedke was born in Twin Falls, Idaho. He graduated from Oakley High School and from Brigham Young University with Bachelor of Science in finance. He served a mission for the Church of Jesus Christ of Latter-day Saints in Italy from 1977 to 1979.

Career
When long-time legislator Jim Kempton resigned his seat for an appointment to the Northwest Power and Conservation Council, Legislative District 25 Central Committee met to fill the vacancy in House Seat A, sending three names in order of preference to Governor Dirk Kempthorne: Bedke, Garry Turner of Burley, and ODeen Redman of Albion. Governor Kempthore appointed Bedke to serve the remainder of Kempton's term.

After redistricting in 2002, Bedke was challenged in the Republican primary by Tim Willie and in the general election by Dan Ralphs, both of whom he defeated. Bedke was challenged in the 2004 Republican primary by Wayne Bagwell, whom he also defeated, and has run unopposed in every election since.

Committees 
Prior to being elected as speaker in 2012, Bedke served on the following House Committees:
Joint Finance & Appropriations Committee
Revenue & Taxation Committee
Resources & Conservation Committee
Transportation & Defense Committee
Chair Economic Outlook & Revenue Assessment Committee
Credit Rating Enhancement Committee

2022 lieutenant governor campaign 

On May 17, 2022, Bedke won the Republican nomination in the statewide primary for the 2022 Idaho lieutenant gubernatorial election. He defeated Priscilla Giddings and Daniel Gasiorowski in the primary election and then defeated Democrat Terri Pickens Manweiler in the general election on November 8, 2022.

Elections

Personal life
Bedke is married and has four children and sixteen grandchildren. He grew up in Oakley, Idaho.

References

External links
Campaign site
 

|-

 

 

20th-century Mormon missionaries
21st-century American politicians
American Mormon missionaries in Italy
Brigham Young University alumni
Latter Day Saints from Idaho
Lieutenant Governors of Idaho
Living people
People from Oakley, Idaho
People from Twin Falls, Idaho
Speakers of the Idaho House of Representatives
Republican Party members of the Idaho House of Representatives
Year of birth missing (living people)